Joshua Coyne (born March 5, 1993) is an American musician and composer.

Personal biography 
Joshua was born in Kansas City, Missouri, on March 5, 1993. He was adopted at the age of two and moved to Cedar Rapids, Iowa. The Coyne family was involved in the local arts community, participating at Theatre Cedar Rapids and the Cedar Rapids Symphony. Joshua quickly expressed interest and aptitude in music and took his first lessons at the Cedar Rapids Symphony School. In 2006, Joshua and some of his family moved to the Washington, D.C. area, where he continued his violin studies with Lya Stern and began composition study.

After moving to D.C., Joshua performed for then candidate Barack Obama at the Stand for Change Rally in February 2008, as well as for the Haitian Embassy.

Coyne composed the score to Anne and Emmett, a play about Emmett Till and Anne Frank written by Janet Langhart Cohen. The premiere of the play was to be held at the United States Holocaust Memorial Museum on June 10, 2009, but was canceled due to a shooting earlier that day.

In the summer of 2011, Joshua was the subject of a series of articles describing the difficulties students may have getting scholarships, loans, and grants, to be able to afford college. As a result of these articles, Joshua received numerous donations which allowed him to attend Manhattan School of Music.

Joshua plays on a custom bow by Joshua Henry, and a violin he named "Lya" for his teacher, made by Joseph Curtin.

Coyne is the co-subject of a documentary film entitled Sonata Mulattica, which will compare his life with the life of George Bridgetower based on the collection of poems of the same name, written by poet laureate Rita Dove.

Education 
 Violin instruction by Lya Stern, herself a student of Jascha Heifetz and Raphael Bronstein, who were in turn students of Leopold Auer
 Composition instruction from Judah Adashi at Peabody Institute
 Composition instruction from Joel Hoffman, chair of the composition department at the College Conservatory of Music at the University of Cincinnati
 Composition mentor Marvin Hamlisch
 Graduated from Winston Churchill High School (Potomac, Maryland)
 Conservatory students accepted in 2011 into the Manhattan School of Music composition department, studying under Robert Sirota and  Richard Danielpour

Notable accomplishments

Performances
 Performed for 13,000 at Barack Obama's Rally for Change 
 Performed the role of Tom Collins in Rent at the 2009 American High School Theatre Festival in Edinburgh, Scotland
 Performed a solo concert at the Kennedy Center Millennium Stage

Compositions
 Composed the score for Anne and Emmett, a play by Janet Langhart Cohen about Emmett Till and Anne Frank
 Daydream, a composition which won Gold at the NAACP Afro-Academic, Cultural, Technological and Scientific Olympics.
 Composed True Love, a three-movement ballet

Awards
 Named one of Bethesda Magazine's 2011 Top Teens
 NAACP ACTSO Gold
 Discus Awards scholarship winner

Other
 Subject of a article describing the difficulties students may have getting funding for college.

External links 
 Daydream
 Daydream with video
 Maryland Gazette Interview (video)
 NAACP ACT-SO Awards
 Documentary "Joshua Coyne: On Composing"
 American Composer Forum profile
 Joshua Russell and Joshua Coyne at the Haitian Embassy

References 

 http://www.publicbroadcasting.net/wypr/news.newsmain?action=article&ARTICLE_ID=1300950
 https://web.archive.org/web/20110728092020/http://www.theatrelab.org/josh.asp
 https://web.archive.org/web/20110515120605/http://www.connectionnewspapers.com/article.asp?article=311236&paper=70&cat=180
 "Musical expression gives students an emotional outlet", The Churchill Observer, January 4, 2010
 https://web.archive.org/web/20110710164418/http://easterniowalife.com/2010/12/09/cedar-rapids-native-to-be-showcased-in-documentary/

1993 births
African-American classical composers
American classical composers
African-American male classical composers
American jazz violinists
American male violinists
Child classical musicians
American child musicians
American adoptees
Living people
Musicians from Kansas City, Missouri
Musicians from Cedar Rapids, Iowa
People from Potomac, Maryland
American male classical composers
Jazz musicians from Maryland
Jazz musicians from Missouri
Classical musicians from Missouri
Musicians from New York City
Jazz musicians from New York (state)
Classical musicians from New York (state)
21st-century American violinists
21st-century American male musicians
American male jazz musicians
21st-century African-American musicians